Jameatur Rashad is an Islamic educational institute in Azamgarh, India. It was founded by Maulana Mujeebullah Nadwi in 1962. Maulana Aamir Rashadi Madni who president of Rashtriya Ulama Council is director of the Jamia.

Jamiatur Rashad, An educational Institute, a centre which has been enlightening the souls of not only Azmi's (People From Azamgarh) but the people from different parts of the nation. It's not only an educational institute but a Tahreek encouraging and motivating brothers and sisters to follow Sirat-e-Mustaqeem.

It was founded in 1962 by Hazrat Maulana Mujeebullah Nadvi Rahmatullah alaih. Maulana Aamir Rashadi Madni is the Chairman of The Jamiatur Rashad Educational Society, Azamgarh.

Mosque

References

Madrasas in India
Education in Azamgarh
1962 establishments in Uttar Pradesh
Educational institutions established in 1962